The 2016 Open Harmonie mutuelle was a professional tennis tournament played on hard courts. It was the thirteenth edition of the tournament which was part of the 2016 ATP Challenger Tour. It took place in Saint-Brieuc, France between 28 March and 3 April 2016.

Singles main-draw entrants

Seeds

 Rankings are as of March 21, 2016.

Other entrants
The following players received wildcards into the singles main draw:
  Gleb Sakharov
  Alexandre Sidorenko
  Maxime Teixeira
  Tak Khunn Wang

The following players received entry as an alternate:
  Jonathan Eysseric

The following players received entry from the qualifying draw:
  Andreas Beck
  Rémi Boutillier
  Edward Corrie
  Sadio Doumbia

Champions

Singles

 Alexandre Sidorenko def.  Igor Sijsling, 2–6, 6–3, 7–6(7–3)

Doubles

  Rameez Junaid /  Andreas Siljeström def.  James Cerretani /  Antal van der Duim, 5–7, 7–6(7–4), [10–8]

External links
Official Website

Open Harmonie mutuelle
Saint-Brieuc Challenger
2016 in French tennis
March 2016 sports events in France
April 2016 sports events in France